Mettu Aata is a class of dancing performed by the inhabitants of southern India. It is considered to be a beautiful dance with slow articulated movements.

Most of the "Badaga Hatties" dance to the tunes of "Mettu Aata" with special reference to "B.Manihatty" which is known for its refined version.

"Mettu Aata" in native Badaga language means "Foot tap dance". "Aata" means dance.

See also
Dance in India
Dance India Dance

References

Culture of Indian diaspora